Dorothea Adelheid Dreier (1870–1923) was an American painter.

Biography
Dreier was born in Brooklyn, New York, on December 8, 1870. Her five siblings included the painter Katherine S. Dreier, social reformer Mary Dreier, and the labor leader Margaret Dreier Robins. She studied in New York City where her teachers included John Twachtman and William Merritt Chase. She studied at the Art Students League of New York. She was a member of the Society of Independent Artists.

She died in 1923 in Saranac, New York. A posthumous retrospective of her work was held at the Brooklyn Museum in 1925.

Dreier's work is in the collection of the Brooklyn Museum. Her papers are in the Archives of American Art at the Smithsonian Institution.

References

External links
 

1870 births
1923 deaths
American women painters
19th-century American women artists
20th-century American women artists
19th-century American painters
20th-century American painters
Artists from Brooklyn
Painters from New York City
Art Students League of New York alumni